Jordan López Pérez (born 13 November 1986) is a Gibraltarian volleyball player and footballer who plays for Lynx in the Gibraltar Football League, and represented the Gibraltar national team in UEFA competition from 2013 until 2017, as a goalkeeper.

Club career
Perez started his career with College Europa and joined Manchester 62 in 2008, after a short stint at Lynx. In 2013, he moved to fellow league team Lincoln Red Imps, being champion of the League, the Cup and the League Cup.

In October 2014 Perez rescinded with Lincoln, due to the lack of first team action, and joined Lions Gibraltar shortly after.

In April 2015, Perez joined League 2 Side Wycombe Wanderers on a weeks training, despite interest from Ipswich Town.

He signed for St Joseph's F.C. in summer 2015 after a season at Lions. Shortly after the arrival of former Lincoln boss Raul Procopio at St Joseph's, Perez left the club, citing a growing loss of interest in football and the need to take a break from the sport. He will re-assess his options in the summer.

In the summer of 2017 Jordan committed his future to the ambitious project at F.C. Olympique 13 teaming up with Scottish manager Lewis Fraser, however, he left the club at the end of the season. In August 2019, he returned to football when he signed for Gibraltar United, providing competition for young keeper Christian Lopez after the departure of Kyle Goldwin. 9 days later, Gibraltar United were expelled from the league for failing to repay debts, so Perez instead joined Boca Gibraltar, making his debut the next day against Manchester 62. After leaving Boca and serving as a goalkeeping coach for the Gibraltar national under-21 football team, he returned to football again in July 2020 when he signed for Mons Calpe. In February 2021 he moved to Bruno's Magpies.

International career
Perez made his international debut with Gibraltar on 19 November 2013 in a 0–0 home draw with Slovakia. This was Gibraltar's first game since being admitted to UEFA. On 13 June 2015, Perez made arguably the save of his career by saving a penalty from German captain Bastian Schweinsteiger in a match against Germany in a European Qualifier to prevent Gibraltar from going 1–0 down. Despite Germany going on to win the game 7–0, Perez was impressed with his team's performance and described his penalty save as 'surreal'.

Personal life
Perez is a fireman for the City Fire Brigade Gibraltar. He has also represented Gibraltar in indoor volleyball at the 2007 Island Games and beach volleyball at the 2019 Island Games.

Honours
Lincoln Red Imps
 Gibraltar Premier Division: 2013–14
 Rock Cup: 2014
 Gibraltar Premier Cup: 2013–2014

References

External links

 
 
 

1986 births
Living people
Gibraltarian footballers
Association football goalkeepers
Europa F.C. players
F.C. Bruno's Magpies players
F.C. Olympique 13 players
Lynx F.C. players
Lincoln Red Imps F.C. players
Manchester 62 F.C. players
St Joseph's F.C. players
Lions Gibraltar F.C. players
Gibraltar international footballers
Gibraltar Premier Division players
Gibraltar National League players